Ella Fitzgerald Sings the Jerome Kern Song Book is a 1963 studio album by the American jazz singer Ella Fitzgerald accompanied by an orchestra arranged and conducted by Nelson Riddle. The album focuses on the songs of the composer Jerome Kern.

This was the second of Fitzgerald's Song Book series to have been orchestrated by Riddle; their previous collaboration was her George and Ira Gershwin Song Book in 1959. Fitzgerald and Riddle also recorded two albums of standards, Ella Swings Brightly with Nelson and Ella Swings Gently with Nelson, in 1962.

This was the seventh and penultimate album in Fitzgerald's Song Book series of songs written by musical theater composers; it was preceded by 1961's Ella Fitzgerald Sings the Harold Arlen Song Book and followed by Ella Fitzgerald Sings the Johnny Mercer Song Book in 1964.

Awarded four and a half stars by Down Beat magazine in 1963.

Track listing
For the 1963 Verve LP release; Verve V6-4060; Re-issued in 2005 on CD, Verve B0003933-02

Side One:
"Let's Begin" (Otto Harbach) – 2:56
"A Fine Romance" (Dorothy Fields) – 3:36
"All the Things You Are" (Oscar Hammerstein II) – 3:15
"I'll Be Hard to Handle" (Bernard Dougall) – 3:47
"You Couldn't Be Cuter" (Fields) – 3:13
"She Didn't Say Yes" (Harbach) – 3:20
Side Two:
"I'm Old Fashioned" (Johnny Mercer) – 3:27
"Remind Me" (Fields) – 3:50
"The Way You Look Tonight" (Fields) – 4:28
"Yesterdays" (Harbach) – 2:51
"Can't Help Lovin' Dat Man" (Hammerstein) – 3:54
"Why Was I Born?" (Hammerstein) – 3:44

All music written by Jerome Kern with lyricists as indicated.

Personnel 
Recorded January 5–7, 1963 at Radio Recorders Studio 10H, Los Angeles:

Tracks 1,3,5-6 and 8

 Ella Fitzgerald - Vocals
 Don Fagerquist - Trumpet
 Caroll Lewis
 Dick Nash - Trombone
 George Seaberg
 Shorty Sherock
 Tommy Pederson
 Tommy Shepard
 George Roberts
 Plas Johnson - Tenor Saxophone
 Harry Klee - Woodwind
 Joe Koch
 Wilbur Schwartz - woodwinds
 Victor Arno - Violin
 Israel Baker
 Victor Bay
 Alex Beller
 Armand Kaproff - Cello
 Ray Kramer
 Dan Lube
 Erno Neufeld
 Lou Raderman
 Nathan Ross
 Alex Neimann - Viola
 Paul Robyn
 Barbara Simons
 Eleanor Slatkin - Cello
 Paul Smith - Piano
 Sidney Sharp
 Gerald Vinci
 Champ Webb
 Robert Bain - Guitar
 Joe Comfort - Double bass
 Frank Flynn - drums
 Alvin Stoller - Drums
 Nelson Riddle - Arranger, Conductor

On Tracks 2,4, and 7:

Personnel same as tracks 1,3,5-6, and 8 except Felix Slatkin and Marshall Sosson violin replace Don Lube and Sidney Sharp; Edgar Lustgarten cello replaces Ray Kramer; and add Ann Stockton on harp.

References

External links
 Album review from a Dorothy Fields perspective

1963 albums
Albums arranged by Nelson Riddle
Albums conducted by Nelson Riddle
Albums produced by Norman Granz
Ella Fitzgerald albums
Jerome Kern tribute albums
Verve Records albums